Roy Clifton Hogsed (December 24, 1919, in Flippin, Arkansas - March 1978) was an American country music singer. He is best known for his song "Cocaine Blues", which he took to number 15 on the country music charts in 1948. Although he was active in the music business for only seven years, "Cocaine Blues" has been widely covered. Roy Hogsed was the first artist to record the Rockabilly song Gonna Get Along Without You Now made famous by Teresa Brewer (1952), Patience and Prudence (1956), Skeeter Davis (1964), Trini Lopez (1967) and Viola Wills (1979).

Singles

Discography

Compilations
 Cocaine Blues (Bear Family BCD-16191, 1999)

References

1919 births
1978 deaths
American country singer-songwriters
American male singer-songwriters
Singer-songwriters from Arkansas
20th-century American singers
Country musicians from Arkansas
20th-century American male singers